Agricultural wastes may refer to:

 Agricultural pollution, byproducts of farming practices that can result in degradation of surrounding ecosystems
 Agricultural wastewater
 Green waste, biodegradable waste
 The former title of the scientific journal Bioresource Technology